The Pennridge Regional Police is a regional police force covering East and West Rockhill Townships in Bucks County, Pennsylvania. It is headquartered at 200 Ridge Rd. Sellersville, Pennsylvania. The current Police Chief is Paul T. Dickinson Jr.

In 2016, the Department consists of 10 sworn officers and one administrative assistant.

Services
The department provides:
 Patrol and response
 Traffic Safety and Accident Reconstruction Unit
 Bicycle Patrol Unit
 Criminal Investigation Unit
 Tactical Team and Youth Services Unit
 Youth Aid Panel

Pennridge Regional Police Commission
The three person Pennridge Regional Police commission has general oversight over the Pennridge Regional Police Department. These are the current Commissioners:

Gary Volovnik, East Rockhill Township Representative
Don Duvall, West Rockhill Township Representative
Jay Keyser, West Rockhill Township Representative

History
The Pennridge Regional Police was formed in 1992 to provide police services to East and West Rockhill Townships, and Sellersville Borough. Sellersville is now covered by the Perkasie Borough Police Department.

Notes and references

External links
 Official Site 
 Pics of PD cars at Policecarsite.com 
 West Rockhill PD page 
 West Rockhill PD Newsletter
 East Rockhill PD page 

Municipal police departments of Pennsylvania